Tarek Abou Al Dahab (born 25 December 1939) is a former Lebanese cyclist. He competed at the 1968 Summer Olympics and the 1972 Summer Olympics.

References

External links
 

1939 births
Living people
Lebanese male cyclists
Olympic cyclists of Lebanon
Cyclists at the 1968 Summer Olympics
Cyclists at the 1972 Summer Olympics
Sportspeople from Beirut